Skyline Church is an evangelical Christian megachurch located in La Mesa, California, a suburb of San Diego, affiliated with the Wesleyan Church denomination. The church currently averages 2,500 in attendance per week.

History 

In 1954, Orval Butcher founded Skyline Wesleyan Church in Lemon Grove, California and served as senior pastor for 27 years. In 1974, because the church had outgrown its original 350-seat sanctuary, a 1,000-seat auditorium was completed. Weekly attendance had grown to about 1,100 when he retired in 1981.

In 1981, John C. Maxwell succeeded Butcher as the church's second senior pastor. Under Maxwell's leadership, Skyline nearly tripled its average attendance, from 1,100 to 3,000. In 1995, Maxwell stepped down to focus on his international ministry, Injoy, which provides leadership tools and materials to pastors and lay leaders. Maxwell went on to success as an author and "leadership guru."

Jim Garlow became Skyline's third pastor in 1995. Garlow is often cited as an evangelical leader in the political arena, quoted on issues such as the 2012 Republican presidential primary. In 2008, Garlow and the church were noted for their leading role in organizing conservative religious groups to support California Proposition 8, which banned same-sex marriage in California prior to the U.S. Supreme Court's holding in Obergfell v. Hodges .  He is a leader in the "pulpit freedom" movement, which insists that pastors should be free to carry out political advocacy from the pulpit, which currently is in defiance of federal law and Internal Revenue Service regulations for "double tax-exempt organizations", that is organizations such as churches which not only operate tax-free but which also receive contributions which are deductible from the donor's federal income tax.

In 2000, the church moved to a new facility  in La Mesa. (Although the church's address is in La Mesa, it is often described as being in adjacent Rancho San Diego, California). The move was plagued by difficulties, resulting in nearly $27 million being spent preparing the site infrastructure for a building that should have cost only $6 million. Up until 2012, Skyline had one three-story building, called the "Family Center," which was Phase I of the church's master plan. Four weekend services were held in a 1,000-seat auditorium in the Family Center. Ground was broken in November 2010 for a worship center to include a 2,500-seat auditorium, a multipurpose room/gymnasium, a 200-seat traditional chapel, and a café. The new 60,000 square foot sanctuary opened in March 2012.

References and notes

External links 
 www.skylinechurch.org – Official web site

Churches in San Diego County, California
La Mesa, California
Methodist churches in California
Methodist megachurches in the United States
Megachurches in California
Christian organizations established in 1954
Christian denominations established in the 20th century